The Arun District Council elections, 2015 took place on Thursday 7 May 2015, electing all 54 members of the council, and taking place alongside a general election and other local elections in England.

From the previous election, the council had undergone boundary changes which had reduced their number by 2. One councillor in Bersted had defected from the Liberal Democrats to the Green Party, bringing in the first Green councillor on Arun since the authority was formed in 1973.

Following the elections, the Conservatives held control of the council for their 12th term of office, with Cllr Gill Brown continuing as leader.

Election result

|}

Ward results

Aldwick East

Aldwick West

Angmering & Findon

Arundel & Walberton

Barnham

Beach

Bersted

Brookfield

Courtwick with Toddington

East Preston

Felpham East

Felpham West

Ferring

Hotham

Marine

Middleton-on-Sea

Orchard

Pagham

Pevensey

River

Rustington East

Rustington West

Yapton

References

2015 English local elections
May 2015 events in the United Kingdom
2015
2010s in West Sussex